General elections were held in Monaco on 7 April 1918 to elect the 12 members of the National Council. A total of 15 candidates participated in the election. Out of the 623 registered voters, 534 (or 85.7%) voters cast their ballots.

Results

References 

Elections in Monaco
Monaco
Parliamentary election
April 1918 events in Europe